is a 2019 Japanese anti-war fantasy drama film written, produced, directed and edited by Nobuhiko Obayashi. It stars Takuro Atsuki, Takahito Hosoyamada and Yoshihiko Hosoda as three present-day Onomichi moviegoers who find themselves transported back to 1945, just prior to the atomic bombing of Hiroshima. The cast also includes Rei Yoshida, Riko Narumi, Hirona Yamazaki and Takako Tokiwa.

Labyrinth of Cinema premiered at the 2019 Tokyo International Film Festival. It is Obayashi's final film before his death in 2020, as well as Yukihiro Takahashi's last film role before his death in 2023.

Cast
Main
 Takuro Atsuki as Mario
 Yoshihiko Hosoda as Shigeru
 Takahito Hosoyamada as Hosuke
 Rei Yoshida as Noriko
 Riko Narumi as Kazumi Saitō
 Hirona Yamazaki as Kazuko Yoshiyama
 Takako Tokiwa as Yuriko Tachibana
Others

Production
In 2016, Nobuhiko Obayashi was diagnosed with stage-four terminal cancer. Despite this, he wrote and directed Hanagatami (2017), and decided to start production on Labyrinth of Cinema after Hanagatami was completed. While filming and editing Labyrinth of Cinema, Obayashi was receiving treatment for his cancer.

Plot 
On the eve of closing down for the last time, a local cinema is hosting an all-night movie marathon, showing classic Japanese war films. Three men, Mario Baba (a film buff), Shigeru (a Buddhist monk turned Yakuza street-thug) and Hosuke (an intellectual film historian) have all come to the cinema, albeit for different reasons, to watch the film. A fourth individual, a young schoolgirl named Noriko, is also there to learn about cinema and the history of war. The action starts in earnest when the 13 year old Noriko falls into the Setouchi Kinema movie screen and becomes a part of the film's narrative. The three protagonists also jump into the screen, and find themselves a part of the fabric of the films they were there to watch, as they try to save people from the horrors of war.

The film is largely composed of several interlinked eras in Japanese military history, beginning with the Boshin War of 1868, moving into the Sino-Japanese War of 1894, and into the second World War, with a particular insight into the impact of the war on Okinawa, and later the impact of the Atomic Bomb drop on Hiroshima. The protagonists find themselves in various scenarios within each war.

Critical reception
Deborah Young of The Hollywood Reporter referred to Labyrinth of Cinema as "Nobuhiko Obayashi's opus", calling it "exuberantly shot" and "imaginatively edited". Mark Schilling of Variety wrote that the film "has [Obayashi's] characteristic blend of surreal whimsy and heartfelt emotion."

References

External links
 
 

2019 films
Anti-war films
Films directed by Nobuhiko Obayashi
Films about the atomic bombings of Hiroshima and Nagasaki
Films about time travel
Japanese fantasy drama films
Films scored by Kousuke Yamashita
2010s Japanese films
2010s Japanese-language films